St Andrews Links in the town of St Andrews, Fife, Scotland, is regarded as the "Home of Golf.” It has one of the oldest courses in the world, where the game has been played since the 15th century. Today there are seven public golf courses: the Balgove, Eden, Jubilee, Strathtyrum, New, and the Old Course all on the links, and The Castle Course, a mile to the east of the town. The Old Course is widely considered one of the finest, and certainly the most famous and traditional course in the world. The courses of St Andrews Links are owned by the local authorities and operated by St Andrews Links Trust, a charitable organization. 

In general, St Andrews is a popular hub for golf tourism, as there is a high density of links and heathland courses in the area.  In addition to the public courses there are two courses at the privately owned Fairmont Hotel (Torrance and Kittocks) to the south of the town; and the Duke's and Drumoig, both inland parkland courses to the west. A few miles further South are the modern links of Kingsbarns and the traditional Balcomie links at Crail. Also nearby are the courses at Elie, Lundin, Leven, Scotscraig and Anstruther.  Within 45 minutes drive are Monifieth, Downfield, Carnoustie and Panmure.

St Andrews is also home to The Royal and Ancient Golf Club of St Andrews, one of the most prestigious golf clubs and, until 2004, one of the two rule-making authorities of golf.

History

The history of St Andrews Links goes back to 1552 when John Hamilton was granted a charter to establish a rabbit warren to the north of the links. The St Andrews Links Charter refers to the public ownership of the links and the right of the people of St Andrews to play golf and other games. The right to play golf on the links were subsequently confirmed in local and royal charters.

The land was acquired by James Cheape, owner of the adjacent Strathtyrum estate, in 1821 and sold by his brother's grandson, also named James Cheape, to The Royal and Ancient Golf Club of St Andrews in 1893. Control of St Andrews Links was regulated by the St Andrews Links Act of 1894 and St Andrews Links Order Confirmation Act in 1974 which resulted in the creation of the St Andrews Links Trust.

Public courses

Balgove Course
The Balgove Course, named after the farm on which it was built, is a 1,520 yard, par 30, nine-hole course. It was originally opened in 1972 and remodeled in 1993.

The Castle Course
The Castle Course opened in June 2008, becoming the seventh public course at St Andrews. It is set on a rugged-cliff top a mile to the east of St Andrews with extensive views over the town, and was designed by the architect David McLay Kidd. The course is a par 71 and measures 6,759 yards from the back tees.

Eden Course
The Eden Course opened in 1914 after demand on the existing courses grew. It was designed by Harry Colt, and alterations in 1989 by Donald Steel maintain Colt's standards. It was named after the Eden estuary by which it resides, as the profits from mussels collected there once made up an important part of the St Andrews economy.

Jubilee Course
The Jubilee Course is the third championship golf course at the Home of Golf. It was named after Queen Victoria's Diamond Jubilee celebration in 1897.

Originally intended for Victorian dressed ladies, and other golf beginners, it has evolved into one of the hardest courses at St Andrews Links. The course is commonly used to test junior and amateur golfers for the British Mid-Amateur Golf Championship, as well as the St Andrews Links Trophy.

Initially a 12-hole course, it was expanded to 18 holes in 1905. The course has seen considerable developments under the management of Willie Auchterlonie, Donald Steel, David Wilson and Graeme Taylor. It now plays at around 6,745 yards, and is host to the St Andrews Links Trophy. The Jubilee is one of several courses in Scotland that are under threat from erosion.

Strathtyrum Course
The Strathtyrum Course, opened in July 1993, became the first new 18 hole layout at St Andrews in nearly 80 years. It was built on land that was previously part of the Strathtyrum estate and sold to the St Andrews Links Trust by Mrs Gladys Cheape in 1986.

Old Course

The Old Course, believed to be the oldest golf course in the world, dates back more than 600 years.

New Course
The New Course, located adjacent to the Old Course, was paid for and commissioned by the Royal and Ancient Golf Club who asked Old Tom Morris to be designer. The New Course opened for play in 1895.

See also
The Royal and Ancient Golf Club of St Andrews
St Andrews Golf Club
The New Golf Club

References

External links

St Andrews Links official site

Golf clubs and courses in Fife
St Andrews
Inventory of Gardens and Designed Landscapes